is a Japanese voice actress and singer from Chiba Prefecture who is affiliated with Hirata Office. She is known for her roles as Hana Ichinose in Slow Start and Suzuka Nagami in My Sister, My Writer. She, together with her Slow Start co-stars Ayasa Itō, Tomomi Mineuchi, and Maria Naganawa performed the series' opening theme "Ne! Ne! Ne!" under the name STARTails.

On April 14, 2021, she made her debut as a solo singer under Nippon Columbia.

Filmography

Anime
2015
Aoharu x Machinegun (Female student)
Lance N' Masques (Pre-school student)

2016
Sweetness and Lightning (Female class head)
Cardfight!! Vanguard G (Stray cat)

2017
Chōyū Sekai (Young girl, announcer)
Kemono Friends (Asian small-clawed otter)
Chronos Ruler (Girl, dancer, boy)
Just Because! (Momoka Suzuki)

2018
Karakai Jozu no Takagi-san (Bobcut hair girl)
Slow Start (Hana Ichinose)
My Sister, My Writer (Suzuka Nagami)
Sword Art Online: Alicization (Ronye Arabel)

2019
Boogiepop and Others (Kazuko Suema)
Hachigatsu no Cinderella Nine (Ryō Shinonome)

2020
Dorohedoro (Nikaidō)
Dropout Idol Fruit Tart (Nina Maehara)

2021
Horimiya (Sakura Kōno)
Mazica Party (Anya do Glengard XII) 
World Trigger Season 2 (Hana Somei)
Those Snow White Notes (Yui Yamazato)
Battle Athletes Victory ReSTART! (Chal Walder)

2022
Sabikui Bisco (Paū Nekoyanagi)
Tribe Nine (Enoki Yukigaya)
Hairpin Double (Pink/Hina Kawai)
In the Heart of Kunoichi Tsubaki (Hagi)
Akiba Maid War (Nagomi Wahira)
The Eminence in Shadow (Eta)

2023
Too Cute Crisis (Fianna Tierley)
My Clueless First Friend (Umi Adachi)
Helck (Alicia)

2024
The Idolmaster Shiny Colors (Hiori Kazano)

Video games
2015
MapleStory (Athena Pierce)

2017
Yuki Yuna is a Hero: A Sparkling Flower (Anzu Iyojima)
Magia Record: Puella Magi Madoka Magica Side Story (Kokoro Awane)

2018
The Idolmaster Shiny Colors (Hiori Kazano)
The Liar Princess and the Blind Prince (Narrator)

2020
Azur Lane (Kashino)
Arknights (Folinic)

2021
Blue Archive (Aru Rikuhachima)
Princess Connect! Re:Dive (Shifuna Agato)
SINce Memories: Off the Starry Sky (Chihaya Houjou)

2022
 Fate/Grand Order (Trưng Trắc)

2023
 Towa Tsugai (Karasu)
 Crymachina (Can)

Live-action
 Anime Supremacy! (2022), Nanaka (voice)

Dubbing
 Strange World (2022), Azimuth

References

External links
Official Nippon Columbia page 
Official agency profile 

1999 births
Living people
Japanese video game actresses
Japanese voice actresses
Voice actresses from Chiba Prefecture
Nippon Columbia artists